Ciarán O'Sullivan (born 5 July 1970) is an Irish Gaelic football selector and former player. His championship career with the Cork senior team spanned fourteen seasons from 1992 until 2005. 

O'Sullivan made his debut on the inter-county scene at the age of seventeen when he was selected for the Cork minor team. He enjoyed one unsuccessful championship season with the minor team before playing with the under-21 side for three seasons. By this stage he had also joined the junior team, winning an All-Ireland medal in 1990. O'Sullivan joined the Cork senior team during the 1992 championship. Over the course of the following fourteen seasons he won five Munster medals and one National Football League medal. An All-Ireland runner-up on two occasions, O'Sullivan retired from inter-county football in 2005.

Honours

Beara
Cork Senior Football Championship (1): 1997

Urhan
Beara Junior Football Championship: 1987, 1988, 1990, 1991, 1992, 2007, 2008, 2010, 2011,

Cork
Munster Senior Football Championship (5): 1993, 1994, 1995, 1999, 2002
National Football League (1): 1998-99

References

1970 births
Living people
Urhan Gaelic footballers
Beara Gaelic footballers
Cork inter-county Gaelic footballers
Gaelic football selectors